George Schroder (born 3 September 1995) is a New Zealand swimmer. He competed in the men's 100 metre breaststroke event at the 2018 FINA World Swimming Championships (25 m), in Hangzhou, China.

References

1995 births
Living people
New Zealand male breaststroke swimmers
Place of birth missing (living people)